Sauternes can refer to:
Sauternes, Gironde, a town in the Bordeaux region of France
Sauternes (wine), an appellation for sweet Bordeaux wine produced around the town Sauternes
The SS Sauternes, a World War II steamship built in 1922